WFIS may refer to

 World Federation of Independent Scouts
 WFIS (AM), a defunct radio station (1600 AM) formerly licensed to Fountain Inn, South Carolina, United States
 Washington Federation of Independent Schools